Helena Wanda Błażusiakówna (born 4 February 1926, died 25 July 1999) was a Polish girl whose prayer, scratched on a cell wall during arrest by Nazis in 1944, was set to music by Henryk Górecki in his Symphony No. 3 Sorrowful Songs. She was born in Szczawnica, a town in the far south of Poland only half a mile from the border with Slovakia, and was a member of the Góral ("mountain dweller") community, which spanned the border with Czechoslovakia in the Tatra mountains.

Biography
Under the Nazi occupation of Poland in World War II, on September 25, 1944, the 18 year old Błażusiakówna was one of 16 people arrested and held in the Gestapo headquarters in Zakopane. During her imprisonment she scratched a short prayer with her own broken tooth into the wall of cell number 3, which was subsequently discovered by the Polish composer Henryk Górecki and set to music as the second movement of his Symphony No. 3 'Sorrowful Songs'.

Eight weeks after her capture, on 22 November 1944, Błażusiakówna was being transported by the Nazis by train, and was one of 12 people rescued by guerillas.  She walked over the mountains to Nowy Targ, where she was given a skirt and a large scarf.  That evening she was back with her grandparents in Szczawnica.  She fell ill and spent the rest of the war in hospital, where the staff took great risks to treat her and hide her identity.

Later life
Błażusiakówna survived the war, was married in Wadowice in 1950 and gave birth to 5 children.

The prayer 
The prayer which Błażusiakówna scratched into her cell wall was signed: Helena Wanda Blazusiakowna, aged 18, detained since 25 September, 1944.

Original text : The LiederNet Archive

References

Additional Sources
 PDF University of Turin Department of Languages & Foreign Literatures and Modern Cultures Degree Course in Linguistic Mediation Sciences.  The third symphony of Henryk Mikołaj Górecki: notes for a textual and contextual analysis. Final Dissertation by Stefania Spinelli, 2017-2018. ref pages 33-38   

 GOSC, 8-13-2020, (August 13 2020), Lamentation of hard Helena (Google translation) (GOSC Gość Niedzielny (lit. Sunday Guest) is a Polish weekly Catholic News magazine.

20th-century Polish women
1926 births
1999 deaths
Nazi Germany and Catholicism